The 2006 Mid-American Conference baseball tournament took place in May 2006. The top six regular season finishers met in the double-elimination tournament held at Olga Mural Field at Schoonover Stadium on the campus of Kent State University in Kent, Ohio. This was the eighteenth Mid-American Conference postseason tournament to determine a champion. Third-seed  won their third tournament championship to earn the conference's automatic bid to the 2006 NCAA Division I baseball tournament.

Seeding and format 
The winner of each division claimed the top two seeds, while the next four finishers based on conference winning percentage only, regardless of division, participated in the tournament. The teams played double-elimination tournament. This was the ninth year of the six team tournament.

Results 

* - Indicates game required 11 innings.

All-Tournament Team 
The following players were named to the All-Tournament Team.

Most Valuable Player 
Kyle Dygert was named Tournament Most Valuable Player. Dygert played for Ball State.

References 

Tournament
Mid-American Conference Baseball Tournament
Mid-American Conference baseball tournament
Mid-American Conference baseball tournament